Marivorahona or Tanambao Marivorahona is a municipality in northern Madagascar.  It belongs to the district of Ambilobe, which is a part of Diana Region.

According to 2018 census the population of Tanambao Marivorahona was 15,654.

Only primary schooling is available in town. The majority (94%) of the population are farmers.  The most important crops are sugarcane and tomato, while other important agricultural products are cotton, sweet potato and rice.  Industry and services both provide employment for 3% of the population.

Geographie
Tanambao Marivorahona lies 13 km from Ambilobe and 123 km from Antsiranana  (Diego Suarez) on the RN 6 in the fertile plains of the Manajeba River.

The commune is an entry site of the Ankarana Reserve.

References and notes 

Populated places in Diana Region